The Reina Regente class was a class of protected cruisers of the Spanish Navy. The class comprised Reina Regente, Alfonso XIII and Lepanto.

Design

The main armament of the ships were four  single turret guns. Secondary armament included six single  guns and six  single guns.

Construction

External links

Description of class

 
Cruiser classes